Ede Tóth (11 March 1884 – 1 March 1943) was a Hungarian tennis player. He competed in the men's singles and doubles events at the 1908 Summer Olympics.

Footnotes

Works cited

External links
 

1884 births
1943 deaths
Hungarian male tennis players
Olympic tennis players of Hungary
Tennis players at the 1908 Summer Olympics
Sportspeople from Oradea
19th-century Hungarian people
20th-century Hungarian people